Eight Mile, Eightmile, or 8 Mile may refer to:

Media
 8 Mile (film), a 2002 American film starring rapper Eminem, named after the street in Detroit, Michigan
 8 Mile (soundtrack), rap soundtrack album to the film of the same name, featuring Eminem and others
 "8 Mile", a rap song from the eponymous soundtrack, see 8 Mile (soundtrack)

Places

Australia
 Eight Mile Creek (South Australia), a watercourse in the south east of South Australia
Eight Mile Creek, South Australia, a locality in the local government area of the District Council of Grant
 Eight Mile Plains, Queensland, a suburb of Brisbane, Australia
 Eight Mile Plains busway station

Canada
 Eight Mile Point, Ontario, a community in Canada

China
 Eight Mile Bridge, in Beijing, China

United States
 Eight Mile, Alabama, an unincorporated community in Mobile County, Alabama, United States
 Eightmile, Oregon
 Eightmile Island, in West Virginia
 Eightmile River (Connecticut River)
 8 Mile Road, or M-102, a road and state highway in the Detroit, Michigan area's Mile Road System

See also
 Eightmile Creek (disambiguation)
 Eight Miles High (disambiguation)
 Eight Mile Road (Ryo Kawasaki album)